Vidonovo is a rural locality (a selo) in Cheryomushkinskoye Selsoviet, Zalesovsky District, Altai Krai, Russia. The population was 152 as of 2013. There are 5 streets.

Geography 
Vidonovo is located 50 km west of Zalesovo (the district's administrative centre) by road. Shadrintsevo is the nearest rural locality.

References 

Rural localities in Zalesovsky District